Jejkowice  (German Jeykowitz) is a village in Rybnik County, Silesian Voivodeship, in southern Poland. It is the seat of the gmina (administrative district) called Gmina Jejkowice.

The village has a population of 3,540.

References

Jejkowice